Paul Snyder may refer to:

 Paul Snyder (basketball) (born 1938), Buffalo, New York businessman and former owner of the Buffalo Braves basketball team
 Paul Snyder (baseball) (born 1935), retired American front-office executive in Major League Baseball